Kulasekaranallur is a village in Virudhunagar district.

Villages in Virudhunagar district